This is a list of the tallest buildings in Madison, Wisconsin. Lists vary due to completion status and "approximate" heights provided, so a list of all high-rise buildings showing floor counts and construction status is probably more useful. The Wisconsin State Capitol is the tallest building in Madison. The tallest building in Madison's central business district is the State Office Building. In the mid- to late-2000s more high-rise buildings were constructed.  A height restriction on the Madison Isthmus protects views of the Wisconsin State Capitol. The law restricts buildings to be no taller than the base of the pillars surrounding the dome (about 187 feet).

The history of skyscrapers in Madison begins with the Churchill Building, completed in 1915. The current State Capitol was completed in 1917, and was the third built in Madison, replacing the previous one which was destroyed in a fire on February 27, 1904. Because of Madison's height restriction, buildings rarely exceed over 160 feet in height. The tallest building ever proposed was the Archipelago Village Tower, a 27-story,  office and condominium tower, however it is unlikely to ever be constructed because of the city's height restriction.

This list includes certain well-known high-rise buildings (over 35 meters).  Many buildings in that height range are omitted.

Tallest buildings

References

 Tallest buildings
Tallest in Madison
Lists of tallest buildings in the United States by city